Dasakuta  was one of two divisions (along with Vyasakuta)  of Haridasas, a group within  the Bhakti movement, one  of the monotheistic  Hindu religious devotional movements focusing on the spiritual practice  of loving devotion to a God, called bhakti. This generally means the  worship of Lord Vishnu.

History
During the rule of the Vijayanagar Empire in South India in the 12th and 13th centuries A.D., the Haridasa movement spread from the area of modern  Karnataka. The Lingayatism movement (the term is derived from Lingavantha in Kannada), spread the philosophy of Basavanna, a Hindu reformer.
The Vyasakuta were required to be proficient in the Vedas, Upanishads and other Darshanas. The role of the Dasakuta  was to convey the message of Madhvacharya through the Kannada language to the people. Some of the prominent saints of Dasakuta are Purandara Dasa, Kanaka Dasa, Vijaya Dasa and Jagannatha Dasa.

See also
Guru-shishya tradition
 Paramguru
 Gurukula

Notes

References
 Jagadeesan, N The Life and Mission of Karaikkal Ammaiyar Bhattacharya, N.N. [ed] Medieval Bhakti Movements in India Munishiram Manoharlal, New Delhi, (1989), pages 149-161

External links
Path of Devotion
Haridasas of Karnataka 
A Word to Our Madhava Btethren

Bhakti movement
Hindu denominations
History of Karnataka
Kannada literature
Vaishnavism
Monotheistic religions